This is a list of knife attacks by Islamic extremists carried out by individuals or organizations against civilian populations or against military personnel not stationed in conflict zones. This list includes attacks where an edged melee weapon was used by Islamic extremists.

The perpetrator(s) are not included in the death tolls noted in this list.

2000s

2010s

References

Islamic terrorist incidents